Avaz is the third album by the Turkish band Replikas.

Spending a lot of their early career in dingy backstreet venues of Istanbul, Replikas - “great Beyoglu hopes” (the Wire, UK) – have never taken much notice of the mainstream making so much noise around them or tried to make themselves easy to classify. In a country where popular musicians face challenges when trying to stand out, Replikas have made a unique name for themselves.
 
Taking inspiration from Avant- and Kraut-Rock, and adding Turkish elements with bits of traditional or cultures spices, their new album Avaz has a new bounce and, compared with their previous two post-punk/noise albums, a return-to-roots feel.  Perhaps this is best seen in the raw reworking of Ömür Sayacı, a song which appears on their previous album [Dadaruhi].
 
Producer Wharton Tiers (Sonic Youth, Glenn Branca, Dinosaur JR and White Zombie) has taken their material born in those crowded cellar bars and helped shape and guide their back-to-basics direction: guitars sound like guitars, electronics gain personality, and vocals are perfectly placed in a design where carefully constructed sound allows for wide open musical spaces.
 
Cult, alternative, underground, Avaz presents a myriad of new sounds which will be enjoyed not only by fans, but by a wider audience ready to seek out the cutting-edge creative voices of Istanbul.

Track listing
 Gece Kadar Rahatsız Etmiyor
 İsimsizler
 0_1
 Dayan
 Bahar
 Benden Yüksek
 Ömür Sayacı
 70 Apartman Dairesi
 Deli Halayı İki
 Zift 
 Reddiye
 Taş Var Köpek Yok (Bunalımlar cover - Hidden Track)

Line up
Gökçe Akçelik
Selçuk Artut
Orçun Baştürk
Barkın Engin
Erden Özer Yalçınkaya

References

2005 albums
Replikas albums